Caesium fluoride or cesium fluoride is an inorganic compound with the formula CsF and it is a hygroscopic white salt. Caesium fluoride can be used in organic synthesis as a source of the fluoride anion. Caesium also has the highest electropositivity of all known elements and fluorine has the highest electronegativity of all known elements.

Synthesis and properties

Caesium fluoride can be prepared by the reaction of caesium hydroxide (CsOH) with hydrofluoric acid (HF) and the resulting salt can then be purified by recrystallization. The reaction is shown below:

CsOH + HF → CsF + H2O

Using the same reaction, another way to create caesium fluoride is to treat caesium carbonate (Cs2CO3) with hydrofluoric acid and again, the resulting salt can then be purified by recrystallization. The reaction is shown below:
Cs2CO3 + 2 HF → 2 CsF + H2O + CO2

CsF is more soluble than sodium fluoride or potassium fluoride in organic solvents. It is available in its anhydrous form, and if water has been absorbed, it is easy to dry by heating at 100 °C for two hours in vacuo. CsF reaches a vapor pressure of 1 kilopascal at 825 °C, 10 kPa at 999 °C, and 100 kPa at 1249 °C.

CsF chains with a thickness as small as one or two atoms can be grown inside carbon nanotubes.

Structure
Caesium fluoride has the halite structure, which means that the Cs+ and F− pack in a cubic closest packed array as do Na+ and Cl− in sodium chloride.

Applications in organic synthesis
Being highly dissociated, CsF is a more reactive source of fluoride than related salts. CsF is an alternative to tetra-n-butylammonium fluoride (TBAF) and TAS-fluoride (TASF).

As a base
As with other soluble fluorides, CsF is moderately basic, because HF is a weak acid. The low nucleophilicity of fluoride means it can be a useful base in organic chemistry. CsF gives higher yields in Knoevenagel condensation reactions than KF or NaF.

Formation of Cs-F bonds
Caesium fluoride serves as a source of fluoride in organofluorine chemistry. Similarly to potassium fluoride, CsF reacts with hexafluoroacetone to form a stable perfluoroalkoxide salt. It will convert electron-deficient aryl chlorides to aryl fluorides (Halex process), although potassium fluoride is more commonly used.

Deprotection agent
Due to the strength of the Si–F bond, fluoride is useful for desilylation reactions, i.e. cleavage of Si-O bonds in organic synthesis. CsF is commonly used for such reactions. Solutions of caesium fluoride in THF or DMF attack a wide variety of organosilicon compounds to produce an organosilicon fluoride and a carbanion, which can then react with electrophiles, for example:

Precautions
Like other soluble fluorides, CsF is moderately toxic. Contact with acid should be avoided, as this forms highly toxic/corrosive hydrofluoric acid. The caesium ion (Cs+) and caesium chloride are generally not considered toxic.

References

Fluorides
Caesium compounds
Metal halides
Alkali metal fluorides
Rock salt crystal structure